Patelloa pachypyga is a species of bristle fly in the family Tachinidae. It is found in North America. It is one of the principal larval parasitoids of the tent caterpillar in Canada.

References

Further reading

 
 

Exoristinae
Articles created by Qbugbot
Insects described in 1924